Attambelos may refer to the following kings of the Parthian vassal state of Characene:
 Attambelos I, reigned between 47/46 and 25/24 BC
 Attambelos II, ruled from 17/16 v. to 8/9 AD
 Attambelos III, ruled from approximately 37/38 to 44/45 AD; his rule is known only by the coins he minted
 Attambelos IV, ruled from 54/55 to 64/65; his rule is known only by the coins he minted
 Attambelos V, ruled from 64/65 to 73/74; his rule is known only by the coins he minted
 Attambelos VI, ruled from approximately 101/02 to 105/06; his rule is known only by the coins he minted
 Attambelos VII, Characene king who surrendered to the Roman Emperor Trajan in 116 AD following two years of fighting
 Attambelos VIII, may have been king of Characene c.180–195AD; known with certainty only from the coins of his son of maga, who calls himself son of a King Attambelos

See also
Kings of Characene